The Campeonato Baiano is the football league of the state of Bahia, Brazil. The championship has been played since 1905 without interruption.

2020 format

First stage:

10 teams are included in one group, playing once only against all teams in the group. The four best teams qualify to the semifinals, while the last-placed team is relegated to the Second Level.

Final stage

The four best teams play in a two-legged knockout tie, with the first facing the fourth and the second facing the third placed. The winner of each Semifinal qualify for the Finals, which occur in the same way. The winners of the finals are the champions. In case that two teams end tied after a round, those with the best record in the first stage qualify. The champion qualify for the Copa do Nordeste and the Copa do Brasil of the next year, while the second and the third-placed teams also qualify for the national cup. The second place for the Copa do Nordeste goes to the best placed team in the CBF ranking, while the third place in the regional cup also goes according to the CBF ranking. The three best-placed in the competition also qualify for the Campeonato Brasileiro Série D, if not in any division above it.

Clubs

2023 First Division

Alagoinhas Atlético Clube
Esporte Clube Bahia
Associação Desportiva Bahia de Feira
Barcelona Futebol Clube
Doce Mel Esporte Clube
Itabuna Esporte Clube
Jacobinense Esporte Clube
Esporte Clube Jacuipense
Sociedade Desportiva Juazeirense
Esporte Clube Vitória

List of champions

Titles by team 

Teams in bold still active.

By city

See also
 Campeonato Baiano Second Division
 Campeonato Baiano Third Division

External links
Federação Bahiana de Futebol - FBF Official Website
Globo Esporte - Campeonato Baiano 2008

 
Baiano